Martin Novaković (born 5 January 2001) is a Serbian football central midfielder who plays for Voždovac.

References

External links
 
 

2001 births
People from Zaječar
Living people
Association football midfielders
Serbian footballers
FK IMT players
FK Rad players
FK Voždovac players
Serbian SuperLiga players
Serbian First League players